Adijat Adenike Olarinoye (born 14 July 1999) is a Nigerian weightlifter. Representative of the Nigerian weightlifting federation. Best Female athlete 2020 & 2021

Career 
Born and raised in Lagos. She won the silver medal and 2 bronze medals in the women's 55 kg  at the 2021 IWF Championship Uzbekistan (Best female athlete)She Won 3 gold medals at the 2020 Islamic Solidarity  Championships held in Tashkent, Uzbekistan.  She won 3 gold medals at the 2021 African champions held in Kenya ( Best Female athlete)  3 bronze medals at the 2022 Islamic solidarity games 

She represented Nigeria at the 2019 African Games which is also her maiden African Games appearance and claimed three medals including two gold medals and silver medal  in women's 55 kg weightlifting event.

She claimed gold medals in women's 55 kg and 55 kg clean jerk events along with a silver in 55 kg snatch event where she narrowly missed the gold medal to fellow compatriot Chika Amalaha. However she emerged as the gold medalist in the overall women's 55 kg event while Chika Amalaha settled for the silver medal. On 26 August 2019, Adijat also created a new African record in weightlifting in the clean and jerk category by lifting 116 kg during the 2019 African Games.

At the 2022 Commonwealth Games in Birmingham, UK she won the gold medal with 2 new Commonwealth Games Records: 92kg in snatch and 203 kg overall.

Medalbox note

References

External links

1999 births
Living people
Nigerian female weightlifters
African Games medalists in weightlifting
African Games gold medalists for Nigeria
African Games silver medalists for Nigeria
Competitors at the 2019 African Games
Yoruba sportswomen
World Weightlifting Championships medalists
21st-century Nigerian women
Commonwealth Games medallists in weightlifting
Commonwealth Games gold medallists for Nigeria
Weightlifters at the 2022 Commonwealth Games
Islamic Solidarity Games medalists in weightlifting
Islamic Solidarity Games competitors for Nigeria
Medallists at the 2022 Commonwealth Games